Emil Botta (15 September 1911, Adjud – 24 July 1977, Bucharest) was a Romanian actor and writer.

Botta graduated in 1932 from the Dramatical Art Conservatory of Bucharest.

He was married for a while to actress Maria Mimi Botta.

He was the younger brother of poet Dan Botta.

Poetry
 Întunecatul April (1937)
 Pe-o gură de rai (1943)
 Poezii, (1966)
 Versuri (includes Vineri), (1971)
 Poeme, (1974)
 Un dor fără saţiu, (1976)

Prose
 Trântorul, (1938) (second edition 1967)

Awards
 Premiul Fundaţiilor Regale (1937)
 Premiul "Mihai Eminescu" al Academiei Române (1967)

Legacy
In Romania, there is a national poetry festival named in his honor. The Emil Botta National College in Adjud is named after him.

Presence in English Language Anthologies 

 Testament - 400 Years of Romanian Poetry - 400 de ani de poezie românească - bilingual edition - Daniel Ioniță (editor and principal translator) with Daniel Reynaud, Adriana Paul & Eva Foster - Editura Minerva, 2019 - 
 Romanian Poetry from its Origins to the Present - bilingual edition English/Romanian - Daniel Ioniță (editor and principal translator) with Daniel Reynaud, Adriana Paul and Eva Foster - Australian-Romanian Academy Publishing - 2020 -  ;

References

 Doina Uricariu, Prefața la Emil Botta Le chevalier a l'escargot d'or /Cavalerul cu melc de aur, Editura Minerva, 1985
 Doina Uricariu, Prefață, note, tabel bio-bibliografic şi bibliografie selectivă la Emil Botta – interpretat de... Editura Eminescu, 1986.
 Doina Uricariu, Ecorșeuri: Structuri și valori ale poeziei românești moderne, Editura Cartea Românească, 1990. Eseuri şi studii despre literatura română interbelicã, privită în contextul creaţiei și mentalității europene.
 Doina Uricariu: Apocrife despre Emil Botta, Editura Universalia, București, 2001,

Filmography

External links
 

1911 births
1977 deaths
People from Adjud
20th-century Romanian poets
Romanian male poets
20th-century Romanian male actors
20th-century Romanian male writers